Hampton Miller Morris (born February 17, 2004) is an American weightlifter. He is a two-time gold medalist in the men's 61 kg event at the Pan American Weightlifting Championships (2021 and 2022).

Career 

He won the gold medal in the men's 61kg event at the 2021 Pan American Weightlifting Championships held in Guayaquil, Ecuador. He won the silver medal in his event at the 2021 Junior Pan American Games held in Colombia. He was also one of the flagbearers for the United States during the opening ceremony.

He won the gold medal in the men's 61kg event at the 2022 Junior World Weightlifting Championships held in Heraklion, Greece. Lifting 160kg in the Clean & Jerk also was a junior world record.

He won the gold medal in his event at the 2022 Pan American Weightlifting Championships held in Bogotá, Colombia. He also set a new junior world record of 162kg in the Clean & Jerk. He improved this record to 163kg at the 2022 Pan American Junior Weightlifting Championships held in Lima, Peru.

He competed in the men's 61kg event at the 2022 World Weightlifting Championships held in Bogotá, Colombia.

Achievements

References

External links 
 

Living people
2004 births
Place of birth missing (living people)
American male weightlifters
Pan American Weightlifting Championships medalists
21st-century American people